

Preseason 
The Phillies held spring training in 1897 in Augusta, Georgia where the team roomed and boarded at the Arlington Hotel. It was the lone season the Phillies trained in Augusta.

Regular season

Season standings

Record vs. opponents

Roster

Player stats

Batting

Starters by position 
Note: Pos = Position; G = Games played; AB = At bats; H = Hits; Avg. = Batting average; HR = Home runs; RBI = Runs batted in

Other batters 
Note: G = Games played; AB = At bats; H = Hits; Avg. = Batting average; HR = Home runs; RBI = Runs batted in

Pitching

Starting pitchers 
Note: G = Games pitched; IP = Innings pitched; W = Wins; L = Losses; ERA = Earned run average; SO = Strikeouts

Other pitchers 
Note: G = Games pitched; IP = Innings pitched; W = Wins; L = Losses; ERA = Earned run average; SO = Strikeouts

References 

1897 Philadelphia Phillies season at Baseball Reference

Philadelphia Phillies seasons
Philadelphia Phillies season
Philly